The Masonic Temple in Aberdeen, South Dakota is a building from 1899. It was listed on the National Register of Historic Places in 1980.

It is a three-story building reflecting Italian Villa, Moorish, and Romanesque Revival styles.

References

Masonic buildings completed in 1899
Buildings and structures in Aberdeen, South Dakota
Masonic buildings in South Dakota
Clubhouses on the National Register of Historic Places in South Dakota
National Register of Historic Places in Brown County, South Dakota